Janet Fish (born May 18, 1938) is a contemporary American realist artist. Through oil painting, lithography, and screenprinting, she explores the interaction of light with everyday objects in the still life genre.  Many of her paintings include elements of transparency (plastic wrap, water), reflected light, and multiple overlapping patterns depicted in bold, high color values.  She has been credited with revitalizing the still life genre.

Early life and education
From a young age, she was surrounded by many artistic influences. Her father was professor of art history Peter Stuyvesant Fish and her mother was sculptor and potter Florence Whistler Voorhees. Her sister, Alida, is a photographer. Her grandfather, whose studio was in Bermuda, was American Impressionist painter Clark Voorhees. Her uncle, also named Clark Voorhees, was a wood carver and his wife, a painter.

Fish knew from a young age that she wanted to pursue the visual arts. She said, "I came from a family of artists, and I always made art and knew I wanted to be an artist." Fish was talented in ceramics and she initially intended to be a sculptor. As a teenager, Fish was an assistant in the studio of sculptor Byllee Lang.

Fish attended Smith College, in Northampton, Massachusetts, concentrating on sculpture and printmaking. She studied under George Cohn, Leonard Baskin, and Mervin Jules. She spent one of her summers studying at the Art Students League of New York and attended a painting class led by Stephen Greene. Fish received a Bachelor of Arts from Smith in 1960. This was followed by a summer residency at The Skowhegan School of Art in Skowhegan, Maine in 1961.

Fish enrolled at the Yale University School of Art and Architecture in New Haven, Connecticut, attending from 1960 to 1963. There she changed her focus from sculpture to painting. Her instructor for an introductory painting class was Alex Katz, who encouraged students to explore the shows in New York galleries which expanded Fish's knowledge of the art world. During that period, art schools tended to favor the teaching of Abstract Expressionism, influencing Fish's burgeoning artistic style. She soon developed her own direction noting that "Abstract Expressionism didn't mean anything to me. It was a set of rules."

Her fellow Yale students included Chuck Close, Richard Serra, Brice Marden, Nancy Graves, Sylvia and Robert Mangold, and Rackstraw Downes. In 1963, Fish became one of the first women to earn a Master of Fine Arts from Yale's School of Art and Architecture.

Work

Fish largely rejected the Abstract Expressionism endorsed by her Yale instructors feeling "totally disconnected" from it and desiring instead the "physical presence of objects".  Undaunted by the dogma of pure abstraction which reigned in her formative years, Janet Fish connected with images in the real world. Rooted in the Modernist formal tradition and the Dutch still life genre tradition, her work adheres to the world of concrete contemporary experience. Fish's simple, familiar subjects are rendered with formal complexity, richness of detail and the vibrant, tropical palette of her childhood.

Fish is interested in painting light and a concept she has on occasion called "packaging", such as jars, cellophane, and wrappers.

Among her other favorite subjects are everyday objects, especially various kinds of clear glassware, either empty or partially filled with liquids such as water, liquor, or vinegar. Examples range from glasses, bottles, goblets, and jars to a fishbowl filled with water and a goldfish. Other subjects include teacups, flower bouquets, textiles with interesting patterns, goldfish, vegetables, and mirrored surfaces.

Although Fish's work has been characterized as Photorealist or New Realism, she does not consider herself a photorealist.  Elements, such as her composition and use of color, demonstrate the view of a painter rather than a photographer.

Life 
After graduating from Yale, Fish spent a year in Philadelphia then moved to SoHo where she became friends with Louise Nevelson.

Fish was an art instructor at the School of Visual Arts and Parsons The New School for Design (both in New York City), Syracuse University (Syracuse, New York), and the University of Chicago.

Fish had two short-lived marriages, which she claims were unsuccessful at least partly due to her high ambitions and her reluctance to be a "good conventional housewife". She resides, and paints, in her SoHo, New York City loft and her Vermont farmhouse in Middletown Springs.

Exhibitions 
Fish's first solo show was at Rutherford, New Jersey's Fairleigh Dickinson University in 1967 and her first New York exhibition followed two years later.  Fish exhibited over 75 times nationally and internationally.  Below is a selection of the exhibitions of her work.

Modern Contemporary Art, Freeman's, Philadelphia, group exhibition
Janet Fish, Pinwheels & Poppies Paintings 1980–2008, DC Moore Gallery, New York, 2017, solo exhibition
Janet Fish, Glass Plastic, The Early Years 1968-1978, DC Moore Gallery, New York, 2016, solo exhibition
The Annual 2015: The Depth of the Surface, National Academy of Design, New York, 2015, group exhibition
This American Life, Kemper Museum of Contemporary Art, Kansas City, MO, 2014, group exhibition
Fall Fantasy - Small Scale Works, Marianne Friedland Gallery, Naples, FL, 2014, group exhibition
Janet Fish, Panopoly, DC Moore Gallery, New York, NY, 2013, solo exhibition
Compelling Images, Makeready Press Gallery, Montclair, NJ, 2013, group exhibition
Janet Fish, Recent Paintings, Charles Birchfield Landscapes DC Moore Gallery, New York, 2012, group exhibition
Janet Fish, The Butler Institute of American Art, Youngstown, OH, 2006, solo exhibition
The Art of Janet Fish, Ogunquit Museum of American Art, Ogunquit, ME, 2004, solo exhibition
Janet Fish, LewAllen Contemporary, Santa Fe, NM, 2004, solo exhibition
Janet Fish, Samuel P. Harn Museum of Art, Gainesville, FL, 2003, solo exhibition
Janet Fish, The Columbus Museum Columbus, GA, 2000, solo exhibition
Janet Fish, Paintings and Drawings Since 1975, Marsh Gallery, University of Richmond, 1987, solo exhibition
76 Jefferson, 1976, Museum of Modern Art, group exhibition
New York Exhibition, 1969, solo exhibition
 Rutherford, New Jersey 's Fairleigh Dickinson University, 1967, solo exhibition

Recognition 
Art critic Gerrit Henry has described Fish as the acknowledged master of the contemporary still life.

A writer for The New York Times said that Fish's "ambitious still life painting helped resuscitate realism in the 1970s" and that she imbued everyday objects with a "bold optical and painterly energy". Critic Vincent Katz concurs, stating that Fish's career "can be summed up as the revitalization of the still-life genre, no mean feat when one considers that still life has often been considered the lowest type of objective painting".

In an interview, American painter Eric Fischl spoke of his admiration for Janet Fish: "She's one of the most interesting realists of her generation. Her work is a touchstone, and tremendously influential. Anyone who deals with domestic still life has to go through her, she's very important."

Fish has been honored with various awards and fellowships, including:
 MacDowell Fellowship, 1968, 1969 and 1972
 Harris Award, Chicago Biennale, 1974
 Australia Council for Arts Grant, 1975
 Elected into the National Academy of Design, 1990
 Hubbard Museum Award, 1991
 Aspen Art Museum Woman in Arts Award, 1993
 American Academy of Arts and Letters Award, 1994
 Smith College Medal, 2012
Fish's work is included in the permanent collection of many institutions and museums.

Museum collections

 Albrecht-Kemper Museum of Art, Saint Joseph, Missouri
 American Academy and Institute of Arts and Letters, NY
 Art Institute of Chicago
 Bermuda National Gallery
 Canton Museum of Art
 Cleveland Museum of Art
 Columbia Museum of Art
 Dallas Museum of Art
 Dayton Art Institute
 Farnsworth Art Museum
 Harn Museum of Art
 Huntsville Museum of Art
 Kalamazoo Institute of Arts
 Maier Museum of Art at Randolph College
 Metropolitan Museum of Art
 Mount Holyoke College Art Museum
 Museum of Fine Arts, Boston
 Museum of Fine Arts, Houston
 Museum of Modern Art, New York
 Museum of Victoria
 National Gallery of Art, Washington, D.C.
 Orlando Museum of Art
 Pennsylvania Academy of the Fine Arts
 Smith College Museum of Art
 Smithsonian American Art Museum
 Westmoreland Museum of American Art
 Whitney Museum of American Art
 Wichita Art Museum
 Yale University Art Gallery

References

Sources

External links
 Archives of American Art, Smithsonian Institution: Oral History Interview
Some sites displaying images of Fish's work:
 DC Moore Gallery
 
 
 

American women painters
Modern artists
1938 births
Living people
20th-century American painters
21st-century American painters
Artists from Boston
Smith College alumni
Art Students League of New York alumni
Yale School of Art alumni
Yale University alumni
School of Visual Arts faculty
Parsons School of Design faculty
Syracuse University faculty
University of Chicago faculty
MacDowell Colony fellows
Painters from Massachusetts
American people of Dutch descent
20th-century American women artists
21st-century American women artists
American women academics